Les Vallées station (French: Gare des Vallées) is a French Railway station located on the Place de la Gare-des-Vallées in the commune of La Garenne-Colombes, Hauts-de-Seine department in the Île-de-France region. Due to the surrounding density of the stations neighbourhood, it also serves the nearby communes of Bois-Colombes and Colombes. Established at an elevation of 39 meters, the station is located at kilometric point (KP) 6.973 on the Paris-Saint-Lazare—Saint-Germain-en-Laye railway, between the stations of Bécon-les-Bruyères and La Garenne-Colombes.

Opened in 1897 by the Chemins de fer de l'Ouest, the station is now owned and operated by the SNCF. Since 2004, Les Vallées has been served by Transilien Line L to and from Gare Saint-Lazare.

History

First station serving Colombes 

Ridership 
In 2021, the SNCF estimated that 4,068,322 passengers traveled through the station.

Services

Passenger services

Train services 
Les Vallées station is served by trains running on Line L of the Transilien network. Service levels are guaranteed every 10 minutes at peak hours and every 15 minutes at off-peak hours. Trains stopping at Les Vallées serve all stations between Paris Saint-Lazare and Nanterre-Université, except in the summer when they run non-stop between Paris Saint-Lazare and Bécon-les-Bruyères.

Intermodality 
The station is also served by lines 164 and 566 of the RATP bus network.

Railway heritage

See also 

 List of SNCF stations in Île-de-France
 List of Transilien stations

References 

Railway stations in Hauts-de-Seine